Poland is an unincorporated community in eastern Cass Township, Clay County, Indiana, United States.  It lies along State Road 42 southeast of the city of Brazil, the county seat of Clay County.  Its elevation is 696 feet (212 m).  Although Poland is unincorporated, it has a post office, with the ZIP code of 47868.

The zip code of 47868 has segments in three counties (Clay, Owen, and Putnam).  Poland, Indiana is also in Owen County.

The 47868 ZIP Code is centered in Owen County at latitude 39.451 and longitude -86.975. It is a standard type ZIP Code. Owen County is in the Eastern Time Zone (UTC -5 hours) and observes daylight saving time.

ZIP Code Tabulation Area (ZCTA) 47868 has a land area of 58.11 sq. miles and a water area of 1.64 sq. miles for Census 2000.

Demographic Profile
The zip code 47868 is a rural community with 3,111 people as of the 2000 census, 47.6 persons per square mile.

2000 census

The community is part of the Terre Haute Metropolitan Statistical Area.

History
The first blacksmith shop in Poland, Indiana was owned by James A Poland, the year was 1839. In 1841 J.B. Nees conceived the idea of starting a town and with conversing with the 3 other land owners all agreed to set aside land, and Poland was born.

The Poland post office was established in 1846.

Legend
In 2008, Poland was thrust into the limelight as the birthplace of a modern-day Noah's ark. "I know I'm not nuts but it's a big undertaking," West has been quoted as saying. Tom is a former tennis coach and farmer with several college degrees, including one in astrophysics. West plans to build a full kitchen, sleeping quarters for 12 people, two bathrooms, a lounge and a navigation center. West has built the boat especially to resist attack by pirates. There are steel doors with locking mechanisms to assure protection. After completion, Tom and Marsha plan to launch the boat in Kentucky Lake, then take the Tombigbee waterway to the Gulf of Mexico, then on to see the world.

Education
Patricksburg Elementary, Owen Valley Middle, Cloverdale High School.

Cloverdale High School is a public high school in Cloverdale. The principal of Cloverdale High School is Mr Sonny Stoltz. 408 students attend Cloverdale High School and are mostly White, non-Hispanic; Multiracial; and Hispanic. 0% of the Cloverdale High School students have limited English proficiency. 53% of the 408 students here have subsidized lunches. The student to teacher ratio at Cloverdale High School is 14:1. South Putnam High School is one of the nearest high schools.

Cloverdale High School Athletics

Owen County Library OCPL has served Owen County for over 100 years.  Complete history of the Owen County Public Library

Owen County Government
Owen County Government
Owen County was established by an act of the Indiana Legislature, 1818-1819, but was being settled as early as 1816.  Indiana became a state in 1816, and was settled from the bottom up by land-hungry, adamantly independent Scotch-Irish, German and English folk with Appalachian frontier roots, including veterans of the American Revolution and the War of 1812.  Comrades of Kentuckian Abraham Owen, who dies in the Battle of Tippecanoe, named the county in his honor.

Recreation
The Long House Lodge is a 9,000 square foot facility that opens up to a 50-acre private lake through a large, inviting porch. The lodge includes a large kitchen, dance floor, game room with a pool table, ping pong and fooseball. Outside the lodge is a large meadow that can be used for outdoor activities, and a large dock on the lake that could be used for a ceremony.

Cagle Mills Lake
In 1952, Cagles Mill Lake was built as Indiana’s first flood control reservoir, protecting the Eel and White river watersheds. Mill Creek feeds the 1,400-acre lake and is home to beautiful Cataract Falls. These falls resulted from two pre-glacial bedrock ridges buried beneath ancient lake sediments of the Illinoisan glacial period.

References

Unincorporated communities in Clay County, Indiana
Unincorporated communities in Indiana
Terre Haute metropolitan area
1839 establishments in Indiana
Populated places established in 1839